William Prentiss Rounds (August 15, 1827August 5, 1905) was an American businessman, Republican politician, and Wisconsin pioneer.  He was a member of the Wisconsin State Senate (1875 & 1876) and State Assembly (1870 & 1871), representing Winnebago County.

Biography
William P. Rounds was born in Bridgton, Maine, in August 1827.  He received a common school education and came to the Wisconsin Territory in 1845, settling in Milton, in Rock County.  He moved north to Menasha in 1849, where he served in several local offices.

He was elected to the Wisconsin State Assembly in 1869, running on the Republican ticket and was subsequently re-elected in 1870.  He did not run again in 1871.  He represented Winnebago County's 2nd Assembly district, which then comprised roughly the northern-most quarter of the county.

Following the Peshtigo fire, in October 1871, he was active in the recovery and relief efforts, and was responsible for disbursing donated funds and goods.

In 1874, he was elected to the Wisconsin State Senate, representing all of Winnebago County.

Later in life, he was involved in the paper manufacturing business and was president of two paper mills in Menasha; he was also a director of the first national bank of Menasha until his death.

He died after a long illness in August 1905, at his home in Fox Crossing, Wisconsin.

Electoral history

Wisconsin Assembly (1869, 1870)

| colspan="6" style="text-align:center;background-color: #e9e9e9;"| General Election, November 2, 1869

| colspan="6" style="text-align:center;background-color: #e9e9e9;"| General Election, November 8, 1870

Wisconsin Senate (1874)

| colspan="6" style="text-align:center;background-color: #e9e9e9;"| General Election, November 3, 1874

References

1827 births
1905 deaths
People from Bridgton, Maine
Republican Party members of the Wisconsin State Assembly
Republican Party Wisconsin state senators
19th-century American politicians